Spedding is a surname, and may refer to:

 Alison Spedding (born 1962), British anthropologist and fantasy author
 Charlie Spedding (born 1952), long-distance runner
 Chris Spedding (born 1944), English rock and roll and jazz guitarist
 Cory Spedding (born 1991), British singer
 David Spedding (1943-2001), Head of the British Secret Intelligence Service
 Frank Spedding (1902-1984), American chemist
 James Spedding (1808-1881), English author
 Jim Spedding (1912-1982), former professional footballer
 Sam Spedding (21st century), English actor and comedian
Scott Spedding (born 1986), South African-born French rugby union player
Duncan Spedding (born 1977), former British professional footballer